Richard Horne is an English rugby league footballer who played in the 1990s, 2000s and 2010s, and coach.

Richard Horne may also refer to:

Richard Henry Horne (1802–1884), English poet and critic
Richard Horne (MP), Member of Parliament (MP) for Wiltshire
Richard Horne (cartoonist) (1960–2007), British author, illustrator and political cartoonist
Richard Horne (figure skater), see United States Figure Skating Championships
Dick Horne (Richard Courtland Horne), American football player

See also
Richard Horn (disambiguation)